Hari Shankar Sharma (1891–1968) was a Hindi and Urdu poet from Harduaganj, Aligarh, India.

He was awarded the Padma Shri by Government of India, in 1966.

Biography

Hari Shanka Sharma was born in Harduaganj, Aligarh, North-Western Provinces (Now Uttar Pradesh), British India. He was the son of Famous Hindi poet Nathuram Sharma, He is associated with notables poets and writers such as Amritlal Nagar, Banarasi Das Chaturvedi, Babu Gulabrai, Ram Vilas Sharma and Rangeya Raghav.

Poetic works
Sharma's poetic works include: Ghaas-Paat, Ram-Rajya, Krishan-Sandesh, and Maharshi-Mahima.

Books
Sharma wrote many books, such as Adikala ka Hindi gadya sahitya, Adikalina Hindi sahitya shodha, Prayini and Ramrajya.

Award
 Padma Shri in 1966 for Literature & Education
 D Litt. from Agra University
 Dev Award for 'Ghaas-Paar'

References

1891 births
1968 deaths
Recipients of the Padma Shri in literature & education
People from Aligarh
Hindi-language poets
Urdu-language poets from India
20th-century Indian poets
Indian male poets
Poets from Uttar Pradesh
20th-century Indian male writers